Vendela Astrid Young (born August 16, 1962) is a Canadian musician. She is the daughter of journalist, sportswriter, and novelist Scott Young and his second wife Astrid Carlson, and the half-sister of fellow musician Neil Young, who bought her her first amplifier in the 1970s. After a brief run with ‘80s Glam metal group Sacred Child, she went on to record backup vocals on several albums through most of the ‘80s and ‘90s. Her vocals appeared on Neil Young's albums Unplugged, Road Rock Vol. 1 and the Grammy-nominated Harvest Moon. In 2002, she performed lead vocals and played the bass guitar on rock band iST's album Pokalolo Paniolo. Young has also released three solo albums, Brainflower in 1995, Matinee in 2002 and One Night at Giant Rock in 2014, which was co-produced by Victor DeLorenzo. In addition to writing a Canadian bestselling book, Being Young, Young has also co-written music with many fellow musicians, including Nancy Wilson, Lisa Dalbello and the late West Arkeen.

Discography

Videos
Neil Young & Crazy Horse: The Complex Sessions (1995)

 Neil Young MTV Unplugged (1993)

 Neil Young: Friends and Relatives – Red Rocks Live (2000)

She both wrote and starred in a movie titled Haunted.

References

External links
 Astrid Young's Official Website

1962 births
Canadian women rock singers
Canadian singer-songwriters
Living people
People from Prince Edward County, Ontario
Musicians from Toronto
20th-century Canadian women singers
21st-century Canadian women singers
Canadian women guitarists
Canadian rock guitarists
Canadian rock bass guitarists
Women bass guitarists
Neil Young